Subal Das (26 December 192816 August 2005) was a Bangladeshi music director and composer. He was the music director of the first film developed in Film Development Corporation (FDC), Akash aar Mati. He directed music of 86 films.

Early life 
Das  was born on 27 December 1927 in Brahmanbaria District, East Bengal, British Raj.

Career
Das took music lessons from Ustad Israel Khan, nephew of musician Ustad Alauddin Khan. Das started working for the radio in 1963.

Das had been suffering from anal cancer. He died of cardiac arrest on 16 August 2005 at the Lifeline Hospital in Kolkata, India.

Personal life
Das was married to Aporna Das (d. 1996). Between 1948 and 1956, Das played football for Dhaka Azad Sporting Club.

discography

 Swaralipi
 Darpachurna
 Anirban
 Tansen
 Jog Biyog
 Grihalakshmi
 Bhalo Manush
 Alo Tumi Aleya
 Pyaasa
 Kaajal
 Preet Na Janey Reet

Awards
 Lifetime Achievement Award by Bangladesh Federation of Film Societies (BFFS) (2004)

References

1928 births
2005 deaths
Bangladeshi composers
Bangladeshi music directors